Sundar Menon is a GCC based Indian entrepreneur, and the founder of The Sun Group International. He was honored with Padmashri award by the Government of India in the year 2016, for his contribution in the field of Social Work.

Early life and education 
Sundar Menon was born in 1962 to Mr.M.C.S Menon and Mrs Jaya Menon. He graduated in Economics, and further acquired an MBA. The European Continental University(EUC-USA) awarded him with an Honorary Doctorate for his contributions towards the economic development of GCC, in 2015. 

His father was a retired assistant general manager and also a former Principal at the Staff Training College at the South Indian Bank. He was also a former Cochin Devaswom Board President from the year 2010 to 2012.

Career 
Sundar Menon arrived in Qatar in 1986, and worked under various firms. In the early 1990's, he had joined as a business executive in a British Oil Field Service Company based in Doha. 

He founded the Sun Group International in the year 1999, with its first company in the United Arab Emirates. Today, the group has operations in the UAE, Qatar, Panama and India. The prominent business interests of the subsidiaries of Sun group include petrochemicals, natural resources, transportation and real estate.

Philanthropy 
Menon’s philanthropic activities started with the Sun Charitable Trust, which aims at providing health and educational support to underprivileged members of the society. These include the poverty-stricken, persons with disabilities, and also the tribal and rural population of the state of Kerala. The trust also contributes medical equipment to government run and private hospitals. Moreover, it has organized mass weddings for girls from economically backward families, and shelter homes for homeless widows. The trust also supports socio-cultural activities in Kerala. It has conducted music and dance festivals, film festivals and has ardently supported the restoration of temple art.

He is the President of the Kerala State Elephant Owner’s Cooperative Society, and is an avid supporter and organizer of the Thrissur Pooram festival. Being an elephant lover, he had put his seamless effort in adopting methods for elephant care and also in developing an elephant care center in Thrissur. Several welfare activities for elephant owners and mahouts were also organized with his initiative. 

He is also a patron of Pravasi Malayali Federation, which has its headquarters in the United States. Apart from that he is also a member of around 40 other organizations within the Middle East and other countries. He has also made his active participation in the cultural conglomeration of the Indian community in the Middle East.

Awards and recognition 
Padma Shri Award by the Government of India on 31 March 2016
 Asia Pacific Entrepreneurship Award in 2015
Forbes Top 100 Indian Business Leaders in the Arab World 2013 Arabian Business Magazine
100 most powerful Indians in the Gulf 2012
Indo British Business Excellence Award
Forbes magazine Top Indian leaders in the Middle East and UAE
TGM Award for Maritime Solutions and Philanthropy-AMMA Award 2015
Arabian Business Award in 2012
Kerala State Vyapari Vyavasayi Samithi Business Excellence Award
Golden Honour Award for Excellence in Profession and Social Commitment from Kerala Kalakendram (Society for Socio-Cultural Research and Development)

Personal life 
Menon is married to Shyama Sundar Menon and have two children. His son Sanjay.S. Menon is the Director of Sun Group International, Sharjah, UAE. His daughter Swathy Sundar is married to Praveen Kumar.

References

External links
 Official website

Living people
Recipients of the Padma Shri in social work
Businesspeople from Thrissur
Indian chief executives
Indian expatriates in the United Arab Emirates
Indian expatriates in Qatar
1963 births